Charles Maefai (died 2019) was the member of the Parliament of the Solomon Islands from East Makira. He died three months after being elected in the 2019 general election. His wife Lillian Maefai succeeded him in a parliamentary by-election.

References 

20th-century births
2019 deaths
Members of the National Parliament of the Solomon Islands

Solomon Islands people
People from Makira-Ulawa Province